Dream the Dream is the 11th studio album from American musician Stan Bush, released on September 15, 2010 through L.A. Records. The album contains 11 new songs written and performed by Stan Bush and studio musicians, as well as a cover of perhaps his most popular song, "The Touch", which was originally re-recorded for inclusion in 2009's Transformers: Revenge of the Fallen film, but was ultimately not included.

Track listing

Reception
The album received positive reviews upon its release. Transformers enthusiast site Seibertron.com gave the album a positive review, saying they would "highly recommend this album to any Stan Bush fan, as well as fans of melodic rock or just those who enjoy positive and uplifting music." GeekCastRadio.com was pleased that the re-recorded version of The Touch had removed the unpopular rap elements,"I love this updated version and at the end there are a few rock riffs that kick your ass!"
Playswitch.com says the album "continues the amazing comeback that started with 2007's In This Life," adding "with Dream the Dream, Bush once again proves there's more to him than meets the eye."

References

External links
 http://stanbush.com/2010/09/stan-bush-releases-new-album-dream-the-dream/

2010 albums
Stan Bush albums